Qala Qala (Aymara qala stone, the reduplication indicates that there is a group or a complex of something, "a group of stones", hispanicized spellings Calacala, Cala Cala, also Kala Kala) is an archaeological site in Bolivia in a valley of the same name. The valley is known for its rock art. The zone where the rock paintings are found is also known as Qillqata (Aymara qillqaña to write, -ta a suffix to indicate the participle, "written" or "something written", hispanicized Quelcata, Quellqata). It is located in the Oruro Department, Cercado Province, Soracachi Municipality, southeast of Oruro.

The rock paintings of Qala Qala were declared a National Monument on May 2, 1970, by Supreme Decrete No. 9087.

References 

Rock art in South America
Archaeological sites in Bolivia
Buildings and structures in Oruro Department
Tourist attractions in Oruro Department
Caves of Bolivia